Frank Findlay (1884 – 31 March 1945) was a New Zealand politician of the National Party.

Findlay was born in Aberdeen, Scotland, in 1884. He emigrated to New Zealand in 1902. In his younger days, he was a successful athlete, including the champion for decathlon and high and long jump in Northland. From 1921, he was a baker in Hamilton and belonged to the Presbyterian church, where he was an elder. He was active with the YMCA.

He was on the Hamilton Borough Council for 12 years and served as Deputy Mayor for some time. He suffered a heart attack while playing tennis and died in Waikato Hospital some days later on 31 March 1945. He died while holding office as an MP. His death caused a by-election that was won by Hilda Ross.

References

1884 births
1945 deaths
New Zealand National Party MPs
Members of the New Zealand House of Representatives
New Zealand MPs for North Island electorates
People from Aberdeen
Scottish emigrants to New Zealand
Candidates in the 1941 New Zealand general election
Hamilton City Councillors